Gurukkal may refer to:

Gurukkal Brahmins, a Tamil Brahmin sect
Gurukkal (kalaripayattu), a Malayalam term for guru or teacher